The 1915 Illinois Fighting Illini football team was an American football team that represented the University of Illinois during the 1915 college football season.  In their third season under head coach Robert Zuppke, the Illini compiled a 5–0–2 record and finished as co-champions of the Western Conference. Center John W. Watson was the team captain.

Schedule

Roster

Head Coach: Robert Zuppke (3rd year at Illinois)

Awards and honors
Bart Macomber, halfback
 Consensus first-team selection on the 1915 College Football All-America Team
George Squier, end
 Second-team selection by Frank G. Menke for the 1915 All-America team
 Third-team selection by Walter Camp for the 1915 All-America team

References

Illinois
Illinois Fighting Illini football seasons
Big Ten Conference football champion seasons
College football undefeated seasons
Illinois Fighting Illini football